Inokuchi is a Hiroden station on Hiroden Miyajima Line, located in Inokuchi, Nishi-ku, Hiroshima.

Routes
From Inokuchi Station, there is one of Hiroden Streetcar routes.
 Hiroshima Station - Hiroden-miyajima-guchi Route

Connections
█ Miyajima Line

Shoko Center-iriguchi — Inokuchi —

Around station
Hiroshima Inokuchi Senior High School
Hiroshima Municipal Inokuchi Junior High School
Hiroshima Municipal Inokuchi Elementary High School
Hiroshima Municipal Inokuchi-Myoujin Elementary School

History
Opened on April 6, 1924.

See also
Hiroden Streetcar Lines and Routes

External links
Inokuchi Town Map

Inokuchi Station
Railway stations in Japan opened in 1924